Blue eyes is a common pigmentation in the iris of an eye of a mammal.

Blue eyes may also refer to:

Places
Blue Eye, Albania, a water spring and tourist attraction
Blue Eye, Arkansas, United States, a town
Blue Eye, Missouri, United States, a village

Arts and entertainment

Music
Blue Eyes, a jazz album by Miki Matsubara
"Blue Eyes" (Elton John song), 1982
"Blue Eyes" (Yo Yo Honey Singh song), 2013
"Blue Eyes", a song by Don Partridge written Richard Kerr, Joan Maitland, 1968
"Blue Eyes", a song by BZN written Th. Tol, J. Tuijp, C. Tol 1982
"Blue Eyes", a song by Cary Brothers from the Garden State film soundtrack album
"Blue Eyes", a song by the International Submarine Band from Safe at Home
"Blue Eyes", a song by Mika from The Boy Who Knew Too Much
"Blue Eyes", a song by The Chevin from Borderland
"Blue Eyes", a song by Within Temptation, a B-side of the single "What Have You Done"
"Blue Eyes", a song by Gary Numan/Tubeway Army, a B-side of the single "Bombers"

Other arts and entertainment
Blue Eyes (film), a 2009 Brazilian film
Blue Eyes (TV series), a 2014-15 Swedish TV series
Blue Eyes, a nickname of the character Bill Hudson in the animated series Return to the Planet of the Apes
Blue Eyes, a character in the comics series Sin City
Blue Eyes, a novel by Jerome Charyn
Blue Eyes (Ojos azules, in Spanish), a short story by Spanish writer Arturo Pérez-Reverte

Other uses
Pseudomugilidae, a family of fish known as Blue-eyes
AGM-79 Blue Eye, an American prototype air-to-surface missile cancelled in the early 1970s
Blueeyes Productions, an Icelandic film production company
Nazar (amulet) or Blue Eye, an amulet believed to provide protection against the evil eye

See also

Baby blue eyes, a common wild flower of California
"Ol' Blue Eyes", a nickname of Frank Sinatra (1915–1998), American singer and actor
"Jimmy Blue Eyes", nickname of Vincent Alo (1904–2001), high-ranking New York mobster
The Bluest Eye, a 1970 novel by American author and Nobel Prize recipient Toni Morrison
American blue-eyed dolls or Japanese friendship dolls, a goodwill program between the children of Japan and the United States